Kakazai, also known as Loye Mamund, a division of Mamund clan, who are part of the larger Tarkani (English: Tarkani, Tarkalani, Tarkanri) Pashtun tribe mainly settled in Bajaur Agency, Pakistan, but originally hailed from the Laghman province of Afghanistan. However, it has grown and scattered around to such an extent that it is recognized as tribe of its own.

Politics
 Ghulam Muhammad, (Governor General Of Pakistan)
 Malik Barkat Ali (Politician, Lawyer and Journalist)
 H.E. Babar W. Malik, (Ambassador)
 Ghulam Ahmad Bilour, Ex-Federal Minister for Railways, Pakistan
 Maulana Muhammad Ali Jauhar, National Leader, Khilafat Movement, India, 1930s
 Abdul Aleem Khan

Nuclear Scientists
 Dr. Nazir Ahmed (physicist), OBE, (Founding Chairman, Pakistan Atomic Energy Commission, 1956-1960)
 Munir Ahmad Khan, (Chairman, Pakistan Atomic Energy Commission, 1972–1991)
 Ishfaq Ahmad, (Chairman Pakistan Atomic Energy Commission, 1991–2001)

Armed Forces
 Akhtar Abdur Rahman
 K.M. Arif
 Jehangir Karamat

Sports
 Mohammad Nissar, (Founding Member of Pakistan Cricket Board, First Pakistani cricketer, Pro-Pakistan leader)

Media
 Shahid Masood, (TV Personality/Journalist, Head Of ARY One World Channel, Currently with GEO TV and anchorman of "Meray Mutabiq")
 Nadeem Malik (journalist), Senior Anchor Person of "Nadeem Malik Live," Samaa TV, Pakistan
 Nazir Ahmed Khan (20th-century Film Actor, Director and Producer)
 Faakhir Mehmood, Well known Music composer, music producer and singer. 
 Javed Ahmad Ghamidi (born 1951), (Religious scholar, exegetic, and educationist)
 Intisar-ul-Haque, (Rtd. Chairman Department of Philosophy Peshawar University.
 Noman Ijaz (Pakistani Leading TV, Drama Actor)
 Mufti Tariq Masood (Religious scholar, Social Media icon)

Judiciary
 Asma Jahangir (Pakistani human rights lawyer and social activist who co-founded and chaired the Human Rights Commission of Pakistan)
 Irshad Hasan Khan (Former Chief Justice of Pakistan 2000-2002 and Chief Election Commissioner of Pakistan 2002-2005)
 Shujaat Ali Khan (Judge of Lahore High Court )
 Muhammad Munir, Chief Justice of Pakistan

Academia 
 Intisar-ul-Haque (Philosopher, Chairman, Dept. of Philosophy, University of Peshawar 1935-1996)
 Shahbaz Malik (Writer, Professor Erasmus, Punjab University, Lahore)

Government
 Abdul Qadir, (Governor General, State Bank Of Pakistan, (20-07-1953 to 19-07-1960))

References

Sarbani Pashtun tribes